Ryan John (born 25 September 1997) is a West Indian cricketer. He made his List A debut for the Windward Islands in the 2017–18 Regional Super50 on 11 February 2018. Prior to his List A debut, he was named in the West Indies' squad for the 2016 Under-19 Cricket World Cup. In October 2019, he was named in the Windward Islands' squad for the 2019–20 Regional Super50 tournament. He made his first-class debut on 27 February 2020, for the Windward Islands in the 2019–20 West Indies Championship.

References

External links
 

1997 births
Living people
Place of birth missing (living people)
Windward Islands cricketers